Simon François Ravenet (1706 – c. 4 April 1764) was a French engraver. In Britain he is usually termed Simon Francis Ravenet. He was one of William Hogarth's assistants.

Biography 
He was born in Paris, where he studied engraving under Jacques-Philippe Le Bas before moving to London in 1750, where he founded a school of line engraving and is credited with the revival of engraving in England. He died in London.  Some of his work remains on display at the National Portrait Gallery as well as at the Cleveland Museum of Art.

His pupils included the engravers John Hall and William Wynne Ryland. His son, Simon Ravenet, was also an engraver.

He is known to have engraved a portrait of Joshua Reynolds but primarily committed the works of other artists into engraved form.

Ravenet was buried in Old St. Pancras Churchyard on 6 April 1764. His name is now listed on the Burdett-Coutts Memorial, listing the graves of eminent persons lost over the years.

References

External links

 

1706 births
1774 deaths
Artists from Paris
18th-century engravers
French engravers
Associates of the Royal Academy
English engravers